G11 may refer to:

Vehicles 
 BMW 7 Series (G11), a German automobile
 Gribovsky G-11, a Soviet military glider of World War II
 , a Royal Navy G-class submarine
 , a Royal Australian Navy Q-class destroyer 
 Nissan Sylphy G11, a Japanese automobile

Other uses 
 Canon PowerShot G11, a digital camera
 G11 Hegang–Dalian Expressway, in China
 Group of Eleven, a intergovernmental forum 
 Heckler & Koch G11, an experimental assault rifle
 Hereditary ataxia
 Hexachlorophene, an organic chemical
 Logitech G11, a computer keyboard